Domžale is a town and the seat of  Municipality of Domžale. The town lies near the foothills of the Kamnik Alps and is crossed by the Kamnik Bistrica River. It includes the hamlets of Zgornje Domžale, Spodnje Domžale, and Študa. Domžale is known today for its small businesses, agriculture, and light industry.

Name
Domžale was attested in written sources circa 1200–1230 as Domsselsdorf (and as Vnheilden dorf in 1260, Vnsselsdorf in 1302, Vnsersdorf in 1322, Dumsel in 1490, and Damschale in 1558, among other variations.) The medieval German name Unser(s)dorf is derived from (D)unselsdorf, which was presumably borrowed from the Slovene name and from which the initial D- was lost because it was reanalyzed as a definite article. The Slovene name could be reconstructed as *Domžaľe, based on a Slavic personal name such as *Domožalъ and referring to an early inhabitant of the place. Alternatively, the Slovene name may be borrowed from Middle High German Domsell(sdorf), based in turn on a Slavic name such as *Domoslavъ. In the local dialect, the town is referred to as Dumžale. In the past the German name was Domschale.

History
Domžale became a town in 1925 and a city on 19 April 1952. In the following years, Domžale became an industrial center with strong chemical and textile industry. In 1980, the construction of modern apartments began and Domžale became known as a bedroom community of Ljubljana. After Slovenia declared independence, on 27 June 1991 the Yugoslav army attacked barricades in the town, and bombed the radio transmitter and houses.

Church

The church in Domžale is dedicated to the Assumption of Mary. It is surrounded by a cemetery and stands on a hill just north of the new municipal cemetery.

Radio transmitter
The Domžale radio transmitter, the most powerful transmitter in Slovenia, is located near Domžale. It operates on medium wave frequency 918 kHz and can be received at night throughout Europe. It uses a 161 m guyed steel tube mast as an aerial.

Sports
Helios Suns
NK Domžale

Notable people
Notable people that were born or lived in Domžale include:
Ivan Ahčin (1897–1960), sociologist and journalist
 (1870–1948), writer and composer
Tine Hribar (born 1941), philosopher and public intellectual
 (1900–1963), architect and ethnologist
 (1879–1961), journalist and librarian
 (1860–1935), composer
 (1899–1986), composer
Radovan Trifunović (born 1973), basketball coach
Dalibor Stevanović (born 1984), football player

Gallery

References
Notes

Sources
 Bernik, Franc. Zgodovina fare Domžale, 2 vols. Kamnik, 1923; Groblje, 1939.
 Klobčar, Marjana. Občina Domžale (Etnološka topografija slovenskega etničnega ozemlja - 20. stoletje). Ljubljana: Znanstveni inštitut Filozofske fakultete, 1989.

External links

 Domžale on Geopedia
 Official page of the municipality 
 Boštjan Burger's cultural heritage website, Panoramic view of Domžale

 
Populated places in the Municipality of Domžale
Cities and towns in Upper Carniola